The 2021 McNeese State Cowboys football team represented McNeese State University as a members of the Southland Conference during the 2021 NCAA Division I FCS football season. The Cowboys were led by first-year head coach Frank Wilson. They played their home games at Cowboy Stadium.

Previous season

The Cowboys finished the 2020 season with a 3–4 record, 2-4 in Southland play, during the shortened season due to the COVID-19 pandemic. As McNeese State decided to play during the scheduled FCS season in the spring, their schedule only consisted of FCS teams, including all teams who chose to play in the spring from the Southland, and Tarleton State.

Preseason

Preseason poll
The Southland Conference released their preseason poll in July 2021. The Cowboys were picked to finish fourth in the conference. In addition, six Cowboys were chosen to the Preseason All-Southland Team.

Preseason All–Southland Teams

Offense

2nd Team
Josh Matthews – Wide Receiver, SR

Defense

1st Team
Isaiah Chambers – Defensive Lineman, SR
Mason Kinsey – Defensive Lineman, RS-JR
Andre Sam – Defensive Back, SR

2nd Team
Chris Joyce – Defensive Back, JR
Mason Pierce – Punt Returner, RS-SO

Schedule

Game summaries

West Florida

at LSU

at Southern

at Incarnate Word

No. 14 Southeastern Louisiana

at Northwestern State

No. 16 Incarnate Word

at No. 8 Southeastern Louisiana

Nicholls

at Houston Baptist

Northwestern State

Personnel

References

McNeese State
McNeese Cowboys football seasons
McNeese State Cowboys football